Cincinnati Municipal Airport – Lunken Field (Cincinnati Municipal Lunken Airport)  is a public airport in Cincinnati, Ohio, three miles (5 km) east of Downtown Cincinnati. It is owned by the city of Cincinnati and serves private aircraft and the fleets of local corporations. It serves a few commercial flights and is the second-largest airport serving Cincinnati after Cincinnati/Northern Kentucky International Airport which is the area’s primary airport. It is known as Lunken Airport or Lunken Field, after Eshelby Lunken. It is bounded by US Route 50 (historic Columbia Parkway and Eastern Avenue) to the west, US Route 52 (Kellogg Avenue) and the Ohio River to the south, the Little Miami River (which originally flowed through the airfield but was diverted) to the east, and  Ohio Route 125 (Beechmont Avenue) to the north. The airport is headquarters and hub for Cincinnati-based public charter airline Ultimate Air Shuttle, serving 5 destinations in the eastern United States with 16 peak daily flights. Lunken is also home to small charter airline Flamingo Air and its aviation school.

History
Cincinnati Municipal Airport (Lunken Airport) was Cincinnati's main airport until 1947. It is in the Little Miami River valley near Columbia, the site of the first Cincinnati-area settlement in 1788. When the  airfield opened in 1925 it was the largest municipal airfield in the world. The airport was named for Eshelby Lunken, whose father Edmund H. Lunken ran the Lunkenheimer Valve Company. (The family's last name had been shortened from its original "Lunkenheimer" spelling.)

The first aviation related activities in the area were flying lessons offered by John "Dixie" Dixon Davis around 1921. The flights took place just north of the airport roughly where the Lunken Playfield is today.

On December 17, 1925, the Embry-Riddle Company was formed at Lunken Airport by T. Higbee Embry and John Paul Riddle. A few years later the company moved to Florida, and later became the Embry-Riddle Aeronautical University. In 1928 the T. E. Halpin Development Co, later the Metal Aircraft Corporation produced 22 of the high-wing Flamingo at the airport. Also in 1928, Aeronca Aircraft Corporation was formed to build cheap light aircraft; the factory building, hangar 4, is still in use. Over 500 C-2 and C-3 aircraft were built here.
Airline flights began in the late 1920s; in 1938 American Airlines and Marquette Airlines were using the new $172,000 terminal building.

During World War II, the airport served first as the headquarters of the I Concentration Command, before being transferred to the Air Transport Command.

Lunken Airport was supplanted by the Cincinnati/Northern Kentucky International Airport after flooding from the Ohio River and introduction of larger aircraft that needed longer runways. The flooding prompted the airport's nickname of "Sunken Lunken". During the Ohio River flood of 1937, the airfield and two-story main terminal building at the southwest corner of the airport were submerged, except for the third-floor air traffic control "tower". A plaque (which appears from ground level to be a single black brick) on the terminal building, facing the airfield, indicates the high-water mark. The airport flooded again in 1945 and 1948. However, the latter was not before the soon-to-be U.S. Air Force vacated the field in 1947. As early as 1948 and continuing to at least 1966, the Greater Cincinnati Airmen's Club held an annual cross country air race at the airport. In the early 1960s Conrad International Corporation, which upgraded Beechcraft 18s, was located at the airport. In 1962, Wilmer Avenue, the western border of the airport, was moved westward. In 1964 the FAA designated the airport as a general reliever airport. As business jet travel expanded, the 6,100-foot parallel runway 2R was added about 1965 (requiring relocation of the Little Miami River). In 1967, its name was officially changed from "Lunken Field" to "Lunken Airport". The airport manager was fired in 2004, following an attempt to solicit commercial flights from the airport.

Today the old control tower is home to the Lunken Cadet Squadron of the Civil Air Patrol, and is the oldest standing control tower in the United States. The property also contains public recreation areas, including an 18-hole golf course, playgrounds, and walking/biking paths on the levee surrounding the airfield. In 2009 Ultimate Air Shuttle began operations at Lunken with a flight to Chicago–Midway, and has since expanded to four cities, including Chicago, New York, Charlotte, and Cleveland. Currently, many Cincinnati-area companies base their aircraft at the airport due to its proximity to downtown Cincinnati, but most airlines use Cincinnati/Northern Kentucky International Airport. Various proposals have taken place to add air service to the airport, including by Allegiant Air, which started operations at CVG instead, and Flamingo Air, which did not happen. In 2018, a fixed-base operator called Waypoint Aviation began operations out of a new  hangar at the airport.

In 2021, the Mutual UFO Network announced that it was moving to the airport from California.

Notable visitors
From 1971 to 1979, Neil Armstrong was an Aerospace Engineering professor at the University of Cincinnati. He would take students to Lunken Airport to teach them about aviation. 

In 1927 Charles Lindbergh landed at Lunken and was mobbed by well-wishers. In 1964 a large crowd of fans greeted The Beatles as they flew into and out of Lunken for their concert at Cincinnati Gardens.

Several U.S. presidents and other dignitaries have arrived at Lunken; on October 30, 2007, Air Force One landed at Lunken as President George W. Bush visited the abutting Cincinnati neighborhood of Hyde Park for a fundraiser for Republican Congressman Steve Chabot. On October 22, 2008, Republican Presidential candidate Arizona Senator John McCain and vice-presidential candidate Governor of Alaska Sarah Palin spoke to an enthusiastic crowd of 12,000 in hangar A-10. Gretchen Wilson performed to start the rally. Cindy McCain and Todd Palin were also in attendance. Introducing them was former Republican Congressman (now US Senator) Rob Portman. In 2011 the airport served as a backdrop for scenes in the film The Ides of March.  On February 5, 2018, a Boeing C-32 flying as Air Force One landed at Lunken bringing President Donald Trump for an address to the employees of Sheffer Corporation in nearby Blue Ash.

Sky Galley Restaurant
The Sky Galley restaurant was in nearly continuous operation for decades, and is so named because the first meals served on a commercial airliner (American Airlines) were prepared here. The Sky Galley is housed in the terminal building and has large windows and a patio dining area facing the airfield, allowing views of small aircraft and corporate jets taking off and landing. Formerly known as the Wings Restaurant, it was reopened in 1999 as the Sky Galley. In 2019, the lease agreement for the restaurant was nearly cancelled by the city due to potential food safety risks reported by the Health Department. After an online petition on change.org gained over 17,000 signatures, an agreement was reached in which the city would provide up to $100,000 to help renovate the restaurant and grant it another 5-year lease if the owner committed to correcting the violations. However, due to the effects of COVID-19, the Sky Galley was forced to close in September 2020. A proposal to replace it with a new restaurant and hotel was made in March 2021. In December, the Cincinnati city council approved a multi-decade lease for the building to the developer vR Group.

Facilities

 3L/21R: 3,802 x 100 ft (1,159 x 30 m), surface: asphalt
 3R/21L: 6,101 x 150 ft (1,860 x 46 m), surface: asphalt
 7/25: 5,128 x 100 ft (1,563 x 30 m), surface: asphalt

Thirty-eight T-hangars were built on the airport in 2001.

The terminal building has two floors and is home to one of the oldest air traffic control towers in the United States. A small pilot supply shop called The Flight Depot is located on the first floor and the Cincinnati Aviation Heritage Society & Museum is on the second.

Public charter and destinations

Passenger

NetJets also has a facility in Cincinnati.

Statistics

In 2004 the airport had 108,904 aircraft operations, an average of 298 per day: 83% general aviation, 17% air taxi, 1% military and <1% scheduled commercial. 314 aircraft are based at this airport: 62% single-engine, 21% jet, 15% multi-engine and 1% helicopter.

Top destinations (October 2016 – September 2017)

Total passengers

Accidents and incidents
 On 28 February 1928, a Douglas O-2C crashed while taking off from the airport.
 On 8 August 1928, a Waco biplane crashed after taking off from the airport, killing the pilot and passenger.
 On 19 October 1929, a Consolidated PT-1 Trusty crashed near Miamiville, Ohio after taking off from the airport, injuring the two crew.
 On 9 August 1931, a Ford Trimotor crashed after taking off from the airport, killing the two crew and four passengers.
 On 30 May 1932, a glider crashed at Dixie Davis Flying Field, killing the pilot.
 On 23 February 1934, a Boeing P-12D crashed while landing at the airport. It was delivering airmail.
 On 22 November 1936, a North American BT-9 crashed after taking off from the airport, killing the two pilots.
 On 5 September 1938, an unknown airplane overturned after landing, injuring the two pilots.
 On 10 March 1941, American Airlines Flight 20, a Douglas DC-3 crashed into a dike while landing at the airport, injuring two crew and three passengers.
 On 9 August 1942, a Culver Cadet crashed in Covington, Kentucky after taking off from the airport, killing the pilot and a passenger.
 On 12 August 1942, an unknown light plane crashed while attempting to land at the airport, injuring the pilot.
 On 13 August 1942, an unknown advanced trainer made an emergency landing near Newtown, Ohio, after taking off from the airport.
 On 9 January 1943, an unknown Army training airplane made an emergency landing near Anderson Ferry after taking off from the airport.
 On 25 August 1943, an unknown Navy monoplane made an emergency landing near the airport.
 On 4 November 1943, a North American P-51 Mustang crashed in Forestville, Ohio, after taking off from the airport, killing the pilot.
 On 22 March 1944, an Aeronca Chief with the Civil Air Patrol made an emergency landing near Newtown, Ohio after taking off from the airport.
 On 30 June 1944, a Douglas C-47 Skytrain made an emergency landing near Newtown, Ohio after taking off from the airport.
 On 9 October 1944, a Lockheed A-29 was destroyed in an emergency landing at the airport.
 On 26 December 1944, a North American B-25 Mitchell crashed while taking off from the airport, killing three and injuring six.
 On 10 January 1945, a Curtiss SB2C Helldiver crashed near Newport, Kentucky after taking off from the airport, killing the passenger.
 On 11 June 1945, an unknown airplane crashed in Fort Thomas, Kentucky after taking off from the airport, injuring the pilot and three passengers.
 On 12 August 1945, an unknown airplane, owned by a flying club at the airport, made an emergency landing at the nearby River Downs Racetrack.
 On 16 May 1947, a Republic Seabee crashed in Mount Washington, Ohio, while trying to land at the airport after running out of fuel.
 On 4 August 1947, a trainer plane crashed in Clermont County, Ohio, after taking off from the airport, killing the pilot.
 On 12 September 1947, an unknown two-seat aircraft crashed in Fort Thomas, Kentucky after taking off from the airport, injuring a pilot and passenger.
 On 24 October 1957, a two-seat Bell helicopter operated by Ohio Valley Airways crashed at the airport, killing the pilot.
 On 19 February 1960, a Lockheed PV-1 Ventura belonging to Champion Paper and Fibre Company crashed in Madeira, Ohio, after taking off from the airport, killing all three on board.
 On 30 September 1960, a single-engine plane crashed near Newtown, Ohio, after taking off from the airport.
 On 20 February 1963, a North American B-25 Mitchell made an emergency landing at the airport after an engine failure.
 On 18 May 1966, a Beechcraft Bonanza crashed and burned after colliding with trees while landing at the airport, injuring the pilot. 
 On 30 March 1968, a Piper PA-22 Tri-Pacer crashed on final approach to the airport when the left wing struck the ground, killing the pilot.
 On 27 July 1973, a Beechcraft Travel Air crashed after taking off from the airport, killing one passenger and injuring the pilot and two other passengers.
 On 25 October 1973, a Beechcraft Queen Air crashed into the Little Miami River after taking off from the airport, killing the pilot and a passenger and injuring an additional passenger.
 On 29 September 1979, a Sikorsky CH-54 Tarhe crashed in Loveland, Ohio, after taking off from the airport, killing the four crew.
 On 7 April 1981, a Learjet 23 was damaged by a bird strike after taking off from the airport and forced to return for an emergency landing. The copilot was killed and the pilot seriously injured.
 On 16 December 1982, a Cessna 411 crashed into a bookstore in Montgomery, Ohio, on approach to land at the airport, killing the six people on board and injuring four more on the ground. One of those killed was Carl Johnson, who had embezzled $614,000 and was planning to lead authorities to the location of a buried portion of the money.
 On 20 June 1984, a Cessna 340A crashed after taking off from the airport, killing the pilot and three passengers.
 On 25 November 1986, a Bell 206 JetRanger news helicopter belonging to WKRC (AM) crashed after taking off from a heliport just north of the airport, killing the pilot and passenger.
 On 26 January 1994, a Beechcraft Baron crashed in Newtown, Ohio, after taking off from the airport, killing the pilot.
 On 30 May 2006, a Cessna 210N crashed in Fort Thomas, Kentucky while attempting to land at the airport, killing the pilot.
 On 14 July 2009, a Piper Cherokee crashed near the airport while trying to land, seriously injuring the pilot.
 On 22 Saturday 2012, a Cessna 182Q crashed in Fort Thomas, Kentucky while attempting to land at the airport following a loss of engine power, injuring the pilot and a passenger.
 On 12 March 2019, a Piper Navajo crashed into a home in Madeira, Ohio while on approach to Lunken, killing the pilot. The aircraft, registered N400JM, was flying for an aerial photography and mapping company.
 On 9 January 2022, an unknown airplane made an emergency landing at the airport after suffering an engine failure.
 On 17 March 2023, a Piaggio P.180 Avanti suffered a landing gear collapse after landing at the airport.

See also

 Cincinnati/Northern Kentucky International Airport
 Cincinnati–Blue Ash Airport
 Ohio World War II Army Airfields
 Air Transport Command

References

Footnotes

Notes

Bibliography

External links

Official site
Corporate Author: The Embry-Riddle Company – Embry-Riddle Aeronautical University

Airports established in 1925
Airports in Ohio
Airfields of the United States Army Air Forces in Ohio
Airfields of the United States Army Air Forces Air Transport Command in North America
Transportation buildings and structures in Cincinnati